Gheorghe Grecu Constantinescu (born 3 February 1912, date of death unknown) was a Romanian footballer.

International career
Gheorghe Constantinescu played six friendly matches for Romania, making his debut on 22 September 1940 under coach Liviu Iuga in a 2–1 victory against Yugoslavia at the 1940 King Alexander's Cup.

Scores and results table. Romania's goal tally first:

References

External links
Gheorghe Constantinescu at Labtof.ro
 

1912 births
Year of death missing
Romanian footballers
Romania international footballers
Place of birth missing
Association football forwards
Liga I players
FC Sportul Studențesc București players